Streptomyces abyssomicinicus is a bacterium species from the genus of Streptomyces which has been isolated from rock soil. Streptomyces abyssomicinicus produces abyssomicin.

See also 
 List of Streptomyces species

References 

abyssomicinicus
Bacteria described in 2020